These are the results of the men's C-1 1000 metres competition in canoeing at the 2004 Summer Olympics.  The C-1 event is raced by single-man sprint canoes.

Medalists

Heats
The 19 competitors first raced in three heats.  The first-place finishers from each of the heats advanced directly to the final, and the remaining 16 canoers moved on to the two semifinal races.  The heats were raced on August 23.

Semifinals
The top three finishers in each of the two semifinals advanced to the finals, joining the three canoers who had moved directly from the heats.  All other canoers were eliminated.  The semifinals were raced on August 25.

Cheban was disqualified for not appearing in boat control after the race.

Final
The final was raced on August 27.

Dittmer got off to a quick lead, but Cal took the lead in an early surge to open a one-second gap at the 500 meter mark. The German tried to close the gap to the Spaniard, but Cal held on to win the gold. Also, the top four finishers of this event would win gold in this event between 1996 and 2008 (Cal - this event, Dittmer - 2000, Doktor - 1996, and Vajda - 2008).

References
2004 Summer Olympics Canoe sprint results 
Sports-reference.com 2004 C-1 1000 m results.
Yahoo! Sports Athens 2004 Summer Olympics Canoe/Kayak Results
Wallechinsky, David and Jaime Loucky (2008). "Canoeing: Men's Canadian Singles 1000 Meters". In The Complete Book of the Olympics: 2008 Edition. London: Aurum Press Limited. p. 481.

Men's C-1 1000
Men's events at the 2004 Summer Olympics